The 1973–74 Detroit Red Wings season was the franchise's 48th season of competition, 42nd season as the Red Wings.

Offseason

Regular season

Final standings

Schedule and results

Playoffs
The Red Wings failed to qualify for the playoffs for the fourth straight year.

Player statistics

Regular season
Scoring

Goaltending

Note: GP = Games played; G = Goals; A = Assists; Pts = Points; +/- = Plus-minus PIM = Penalty minutes; PPG = Power-play goals; SHG = Short-handed goals; GWG = Game-winning goals;
      MIN = Minutes played; W = Wins; L = Losses; T = Ties; GA = Goals against; GAA = Goals-against average;  SO = Shutouts;

Awards and records
Alex Delvecchio, Lester Patrick Trophy

Transactions

Draft picks
Detroit's draft picks at the 1973 NHL Amateur Draft held at the Queen Elizabeth Hotel in Montreal, Quebec.

Farm teams

See also
1973–74 NHL season
 1974 in Michigan

References

External links
 

Detroit
Detroit
Detroit Red Wings seasons
Detroit Red Wings
Detroit Red